CAGS may refer to:
Centre for Arab Genomic Studies, the centre studying genomic disorders among Arabs.
Coronary artery graft surgery, a medical procedure to treat coronary artery disease.
Certificate of Advanced Graduate Study, a certificate earned after the receipt of a Master's degree.
Canadian Association of General Surgeons
Cobram Anglican Grammar School, a grammar school in Cobram, Australia